Springboro is the name of several places in the United States of America:

 Springboro, Indiana
 Springboro, Ohio
 Springboro, Pennsylvania